Lieutenant-Colonel Lord William Walter Montagu Douglas Scott  (17 January 1896 – 30 January 1958) was a British aristocrat and politician.

Early life
The 2nd son of John Montagu Douglas Scott, 7th Duke of Buccleuch. His sister was Princess Alice, Duchess of Gloucester (1901–2004) and he was a godfather to her son, Prince William of Gloucester (1941–1972).
 
He was educated at Eton College and at the Royal Military College, Sandhurst.

Career
He was commissioned into the 10th Hussars Promoted to lieutenant in 1915, he won the Military Cross in 1918, and was shortly afterwards promoted to captain. From 1925 to 1926 he was ADC to the Governor-General of Canada. He retired in 1927. He rejoined the Army in the Second World War, serving in Italy and reaching the rank of lieutenant-colonel.

He was Unionist Member of Parliament (MP) for Roxburgh and Selkirk from 1935 to 1950, taking over the seat from his elder brother Walter on the death of their father. He was a Deputy Lieutenant of Roxburghshire from 1945.

Personal life
In 1937 he married his second cousin once removed, Lady Rachel Douglas Home (10 April 1910 – 4 Apr 1996), younger daughter of Charles Douglas-Home, 13th Earl of Home. The couple had one son and four daughters, and lived at Eildon Hall, St Boswells, Roxburghshire.

References

External links 
 

1896 births
1958 deaths
People educated at Eton College
Graduates of the Royal Military College, Sandhurst
Unionist Party (Scotland) MPs
10th Royal Hussars officers
British Army personnel of World War I
British Army personnel of World War II
Recipients of the Military Cross
Younger sons of dukes
UK MPs 1935–1945
UK MPs 1945–1950
W
Members of the Parliament of the United Kingdom for Scottish constituencies